List of chairmen of the State Council of the Republic of Udmurtia.

This is a list of chairmen (speakers) of the Supreme Council of the Udmurt Republic:

This is a list of chairmen (speakers) of the State Council of the Udmurt Republic:

Sources

Lists of legislative speakers in Russia
Politics of Udmurtia